The Women's 200 metre freestyle swimming event at the 2011 Pan American Games was swum October 16, 2011, in Guadalajara, Mexico. The defending Pan American Games champion was Ava Ohlgren of the United States.

The race consisted of four lengths of the pool, freestyle.

Records
Prior to this competition, the existing world and Pan American Games records were as follows:

Results
All times are in minutes and seconds.

Heats
The first round was held on October 16.

B Final 
The B final was also held on October 16.

A Final
The A final was also held on October 16.

References

Swimming at the 2011 Pan American Games
2011 in women's swimming